Bongo (Bungu), also known as Dor, is a Central Sudanic language spoken by the Bongo people in sparsely populated areas of Bahr al Ghazal in South Sudan. 

A 2013 survey reported that ethnic Bongo reside in Bussere Boma, Bagari Payam, Wau County, South Sudan.

Tone 
Bongo is tonal language that has the high (á), mid (ā), low (à) and falling (â) tones.

All falling tones occur on either long vowels or on vowel clusters or glides. When the tonal fall is not due to a preceding high tone, it can be indicated by a high tine followed by a low tone

Numerals
Bongo has a quinary-vigesimal numeral system.

Scholarship
The first ethnologists to work with the Bongo language were John Petherick, who published Bongo word lists in his 1861 work, Egypt, the Soudan, and Central Africa; Theodor von Heuglin, who also published Bongo word lists in Reise in das Gebiet des Weissen Nil, &c. 1862-1864 in 1869; and Georg August Schweinfurth, who contributed sentences and vocabularies in his Linguistische Ergebnisse, Einer Reise Nach Centralafrika in 1873. E. E. Evans-Pritchard published additional Bongo word lists in 1937.

More recent scholarship has been done by Eileen Kilpatrick, who published a phonology of Bongo in 1985.

References

Further reading
 A Small Comparative Vocabulary of Bongo Baka Yulu Kara Sodality of St Peter Claver, Rome, 1963.
 A Reconstructed History of the Chari Languages - Bongo - Bagirmi - Sara. Segmental Phonology, with Evidence from Arabic Loanwords. Linda Thayer, University of Illinois at Urbana-Champaign, 1974. Typewritten thesis 309 pages. Copy held by J.A. Biddulph (Africanist publisher, Joseph Biddulph, Pontypridd, Wales).

External links
Bongo at Gurtong
The Jesus Film in Bongo
Bongo at WALS Online

Bongo–Bagirmi languages
Languages of South Sudan